Kidi Bebey is a French journalist and author.

Bebey was born in Paris, France. Her family was originally from Cameroon. Francis Bebey, her father, was a journalist, writer and musician. His work created a cultural environment for his children that encouraged them in writing and music. Two of her brothers became musicians.

Bebey studied literature at Lille University III and while there wrote a PhD thesis on "danse and litterature in sahelian and bantou writers." She later received a Masters Degree in Management at Paris Business School ESCP. In 1993, she became Editor-in-Chief of Planete Jeunes a Bayard Press magazine for young African-french readers. She was also the Editor-in-Chief Planet Enfants, a magazine dedicated to younger readers. From 2006 to 2009, she produced a daily program on Radio France International named "reines d'Afrique" (Africa's Queens).

In 2016, she wrote "mon royaume pour une guitare" (My Kingdom for a Guitar) which is a book mainly based on her parents life and the musician's life of her father Francis Bebey.

Books 

 Pourquoi je ne suis pas sur la photo , Édicef, 1999
 Dans la cour des grands, Coédition CEDA Abidjan/Hurtubise HMH Canada, 1999 (rééd. Édicef Hachette International, 2011)
 Francis Bebey : l'homme orchestre (coord.), L'Harmattan, 2002
 Les Paris des Africains (dir. Kadiatou Konaré), Cauris Éditions, 2002 (contribution)
 Les ados, grands oubliés de l'édition africaine », in Takam Tikou, no 10, février 2003
 Ouste les loups, Bayard Press éditions, 2004
 C'est dur... Quand papa n'a plus de travail, Océan éditions/SCEREN/CRDP La Réunion, 2006
 Un bébé... Et moi, alors, Bayard Press Éditions, 2007
 Filles et garçons, tous différents, tous égaux, Belin International Éditions/RFI, 2008
 Modibo Keita, le premier président du Mali, Cauris Éditions,2010
 Kwame Nkrumah, Il rêvait d'unir les Africains, Cauris Éditions, 2010
 Les Saï-Saï et le bateau-fantôme, Édicef Hachette International, 2011
 Les Saï-Saï ; Mystère à l'école de foot, Édicef Hachette International, 2011
 Les Saï-Saï et les voleurs de voix Édicef Hachette International, 2012
 Les Saï-Saï et le secret du marché, Édicef Hachette International, 2012
 Les Saï-Saï contre l'escroc du web, Édicef Hachette International, 2013
 Adaptation série télé : Chica vampiro: La grande fête des vampires, Paris: PKJ, Coll. Pocket Jeunesse, 2016,
Adaptation série télé: Chica vampiro : le pouvoir de Daisy, Paris: PKJ, Coll. Pocket Jeunesse, 2016.
Adaptation série télé: Chica vampiro: vampire malgré elle, Paris: PKJ, Coll. Pocket Jeunesse, 2016.
Adaptation série télé: Chica vampiro: Être ou ne pas être vampire, Paris: PKJ, Coll. Pocket Jeunesse, 2016.
Seuls 1 - La disparition- roman d'après l'univers de Fabien Velhmann et Bruno Gazzotti, Paris: PKJ, Coll. Pocket Jeunesse, 2017.
Seuls 2 - Le Maître des couteaux- roman d'après l'univers de Fabien Velhmann et Bruno Gazzotti, Paris: PKJ, Coll. Pocket Jeunesse, 2017.
Seuls 3 - Le clan du requin- roman d'après l'univers de Fabien Velhmann et Bruno Gazzotti, Paris: PKJ, Coll. Pocket Jeunesse, 2017.
Mon royaume pour une guitare, Michel Lafon, 2016, 319 p.,

References 

Year of birth missing (living people)
Living people
French women journalists